Mark C. Schwartz is a retired United States Army lieutenant general who last served as the United States Security Coordinator of the Israel-Palestinian Authority. Previously, he commanded the Combined Security Transition Command – Afghanistan. In November 2020, he was announced to replace Lieutenant General Eric Wendt as commander of the NATO Special Operations Headquarters, but the Senate did not take any action on his nomination.

References

Living people
Place of birth missing (living people)
Recipients of the Defense Superior Service Medal
Recipients of the Legion of Merit
United States Army generals
United States Army personnel of the Iraq War
United States Army personnel of the War in Afghanistan (2001–2021)
Year of birth missing (living people)